The 2018 Alamo Bowl was a college football bowl game that was played on December 28, 2018. It was the 26th edition of the Alamo Bowl, and one of the 2018–19 bowl games concluding the 2018 FBS football season. Sponsored by Valero Energy, the game was officially known as the Valero Alamo Bowl.

Teams
The game was played between Iowa State from the Big 12 Conference and Washington State from the Pac-12 Conference. This was the first meeting between the two programs.

Iowa State Cyclones

Iowa State received and accepted a bid to the Alamo Bowl on December 2. The Cyclones entered the bowl with an 8–4 record (6–3 in the Big 12).

Washington State Cougars

Washington State received and accepted a bid to the Alamo Bowl on December 2. The Cougars entered the bowl with a 10–2 record (7–2 in the Pac-12).

Game summary

Scoring summary

Statistics

References

External links

Box score at ESPN

Alamo Bowl
Alamo Bowl
Alamo Bowl
Alamo Bowl
Iowa State Cyclones football bowl games
Washington State Cougars football bowl games